The Master's University is a private non-denominational Christian university in Santa Clarita, California.

History 
The college was founded in 1927. It was originally named Los Angeles Baptist College and Seminary. In 1961, it moved to Newhall in Santa Clarita, California. In 1985, John MacArthur became the school president; the name was changed to The Master's College, hoping to appeal to a wider evangelical audience. In 2016, the school underwent yet another name change and became The Master's University.  In June 2019 John MacArthur stepped down as president and became chancellor and John Stead, a faculty member since 1970, became the interim president. In 2020, Sam Horn became president of The Master's University and Seminary. John Stead in his 50th year at TMU took the role of Senior Vice President. Dr. Abner Chou now serves as the Interim President of TMUS.

Academics 

The university consists of seven schools offering bachelor's degrees and master's degrees, including several bachelor's degrees that are offered fully online.  The associated seminary offers a Bachelor of Theology (Th.B.) for those with an associate degree, master's degrees, and Doctor of Ministry (D.Min.) and Doctor of Philosophy (Ph.D.) degrees.

In addition to its biblical studies program, the university offers a one-year, intensive Bible training program known as "The Master's Institute" resulting in a Bible certificate. The university has an extension campus, Israel Bible Extension (IBEX) in the Jerusalem vicinity.

The university's schools are the School of Biblical Studies, Pearl C. Schaffer School of Education, John P. Stead School of Humanities, School of Music, School of Online Education, School of Business & Communication, School of Science, Mathematics, Technology & Health.

Accreditation 

The university has been accredited by the Western Association of Schools and Colleges (now the WASC Senior College and University Commission) since 1975. In July 2018, it was placed on probation. WASC reported a lack of qualified leadership and "a climate of fear, intimidation, bullying, and uncertainty" among faculty and staff as reasons for the probation. Probation was lifted in November 2020.

Membership in the Association of Christian Schools International provides The Master's University involvement in programs and services that aid the institution's educational ministry. The schools also holds  Evangelical Council for Financial Accountability (ECFA) accreditation. The School of Music is also accredited by the National Association of Schools of Music.

LGBT discrimination 

The university prohibits "homosexuality or bisexual conduct" by students in its student handbook. The university may legally expel LGBT students because it has a religious exemption from anti-discrimination laws. Chancellor John MacArthur has spoken and written at length in university publications about the threat he perceives from the gay agenda, asserting that "biblical love excludes homosexuality because of its sinfulness."

The Master's University is ranked among the worst American schools for LGBT students by LGBTQ Nation and Campus Pride.

Athletics 
The Master's athletic teams are called the Mustangs. The university is a member of the National Association of Intercollegiate Athletics (NAIA), primarily competing in the Golden State Athletic Conference (GSAC) for most of its sports since the 2001–02 academic year; while its men's & women's swimming & diving teams compete in the Pacific Collegiate Swim and Dive Conference (PCSC).

The Master's compete in 18 intercollegiate varsity sports: Men's sports include baseball, basketball, cross country, golf, soccer, swimming & diving, track & field (outdoor) and volleyball; while women's sports include basketball, beach volleyball, cross country, golf, soccer, swimming & diving, track & field (indoor and outdoor) and volleyball.

Soccer
Curtis Lewis, head coach of the women's soccer team, won the NAIA Women's Soccer Coach of the Year Award in 2008. In 2009, Jim Rickard won the NAIA Men's Soccer Coach of the Year Award.

Notable alumni 
 Francis Chan (1992) – pastor, author, and evangelist
 Ralph Drollinger – White House Cabinet Bible study leader, Trump Administration
 Robert H. Gundry – biblical scholar
 Conner Menez – Major League Baseball player for the San Francisco Giants
 Jerry Owens – professional baseball player for the Chicago White Sox
 Mike Penberthy – NBA coach and player for the Los Angeles Lakers
 Erin Buescher Perperoglou – former professional basketball player of the WNBA
 Tim Soares (born 1997) – American-Brazilian basketball player for Ironi Ness Ziona of the Israeli Basketball Premier League

See also
The Master's Seminary

References

External links
 
 Official athletics website

Educational institutions established in 1927
Education in Santa Clarita, California
Seminaries and theological colleges in California
Universities and colleges in Los Angeles County, California
Council for Christian Colleges and Universities
1927 establishments in California
Conservative organizations in the United States
Private universities and colleges in California